Marko Kristian "Markoolio" Lehtosalo (born 1 January 1975 in Lahti, Finland) is a Swedish-Finnish multi-platinum selling recording artist, singer, musician, songwriter, actor, and comedian. His stage name Markoolio is a portmanteau of his first name Marko and the stage name of the American rapper Coolio.

Biography
At the age of six months, Lehtosalo migrated from Finland to Sweden where he grew up completing primary and secondary school in the small Stockholm suburb of Orminge. Following the completion of his compulsory military service as a coastal ranger sniper in Ekenäs, Finland, he returned to Sweden. There, he was allegedly discovered by producers when rapping on a commuter train in Stockholm; however, this story has been revealed to be a fabrication.

Markoolio is known in particular for his humorous songs dealing with partying, drinking, and girls such as "Sommar och sol" ("Summer and sun"), "Vi drar till fjällen" ("We're headin' for the mountains") and "Sola och bada i Piña Colada" ("Sunbathing and swimming in Piña Colada"); his songs mocking contemporary life and phenomena such as "Åka Pendeltåg" ("Riding the commuter train") and "Värsta schlagern" ("The goddam' Schlager [song]"); and songs relating to his native Finland such as "Drömmen om Finland" (The dream of Finland) and "Jag orkar inte mer" (I can't take it anymore).

Markoolio has released nine studio albums, hosted and participated in numerous television and radio programs, and won several prizes and awards such as Male Artist of the Year at the Swedish Nickelodeon Kids Choice Awards 2007. He is also the owner of a nightclub and the board member of British company Netgames Holdings which he reportedly owns 3.3 percent of. Markoolio was one of the hosts for Talang on TV4 in 2009. He also played the titular character of Doktor Mugg and starred as Tyke Mörbult in Hem till Midgård. Markoolio was formerly a contestant on Let's Dance 2013, a contest he subsequently won.

On 19 November 2013, Markoolio tried to disrupt the Portugal national football team ahead of the second leg of their World Cup play-off with Sweden. He started a "private concert" at 7:15 a.m. in front of the Portuguese team's hotel.

Discography

Albums

Singles

Notes

References

External links

Markoolio official site

Markoolio Biography at Yahoo.com
Markoolio Biography at OGAESC2007.com
Markoolio Biography at last.fm

1975 births
Living people
People from Lahti
Swedish songwriters
Swedish-language singers
Swedish people of Finnish descent
21st-century Swedish singers
21st-century Swedish male singers
Melodifestivalen contestants of 2009